Leggy Mambo (1990) is the second studio album by the Leeds-based indie rock band Cud and released through Imaginary Records.

An extended version called "Leggy Mambo - Gold Top Copy" was released in May 2008 by Cherry Red Records and featured additional remixes.

Track listing
"Now!"  - 2:24
"Heart"  – 3:54
"Hey, Boots"  – 2:47
"Love In a Hollow Tree"  – 4:32
"Love Mandarin"  – 3:45
"Not Exactly D.L.E.R.C."  – 2:26
"Robinson Crusoe"  – 3:19
"Eau Water"  – 3:30
"Carl's 115th Coach Trip Nightmare"  – 3:30
"Magic"  – 3:54
"Syrup and Sour Grapes"  – 2:54
"Brain on a Slow Train"  – 4:42

Catalogue number ILLCD 021.

Leggy Mambo - Gold Top Copy additional tracks
"Robinson Crusoe" (Patchbay Demo)
"Now!" (Patchbay Demo)
"Eau Water" (Patchbay Demo)
"L.O.P.H.E."
"Love Mandarin" (Alternative Version)
"Magic" (Extended Farsley Mix)

Personnel
Carl Puttnam – vocals
Mike Dunphy – guitars
William Potter – bass guitar
Steve Goodwin – drums

Cud (band) albums
1990 albums
Imaginary Records albums